Starman (Jack Knight) is fictional superhero in the  and a member of the Justice Society of America. He is the son of the original Starman, Ted Knight. Created by James Robinson and Tony Harris, he first appeared in Zero Hour #1 (September 1994).

Publication history

Fictional character biography

Origin
Jack is the son of Ted Knight, who, as Starman, was a Golden Age superhero. Although as a child Jack is fascinated by his father's heroic life, he becomes more and more rebellious as he grows older. By the time he reaches adulthood, Jack is disdainful of his father's past. Jack's older brother David takes over his father's mantle, while Jack often regards the superhero role with open disdain.

Although Jack is shown as both schooled and talented in fine art, his true passion is collectibles. He eventually becomes the owner and operator of an antique and collectibles store.

Jack's role in the family changes after David is murdered by the son of the Mist, one of his father's old arch-foes. The Mist then attempts to murder Jack as well, who narrowly escapes by using one of his father's old gravity rods. Jack resolves to track down the Mist out of a desire to protect his father. He eventually kills the Mist's son in battle and captures both the Mist and his daughter Nash, who vows revenge. The Mist later succumbs to dementia after the death of his son.

Early career
Jack reluctantly makes a deal to become Starman if his father agrees to devote his vast scientific knowledge to the betterment of mankind. Jack eschews a "uniform", instead opting to wear his street clothes (though he eventually supplements them with a small sheriff's star and a leather coat with a stylized star symbol on the back); his only "superheroic" accessories are his cosmic staff and a pair of tank driver's anti-flare goggles to protect his eyes during flight and from the brilliant light generated by the staff.

Nash returns as the new Mist and attempts to become Jack's nemesis. She drugs and rapes Jack, with the intent of becoming pregnant. She later gives birth to Jack's son, Kyle Theo Knight. Mist intends to raise him to hate Jack and all he stands for.

Although Jack discovers many latent heroic qualities within himself, he only fully embraces them when Nash theorizes that she and Jack are two sides of the same coin. Jack vows to prove her wrong. To do so, he travels to Hell to rescue two men he hardly knows, tries valiantly to save a friendly incarnation of Solomon Grundy, and helps prove Bulletman's innocence when he is accused of having been a Nazi agent during World War II.

Later, Jack joins the Justice Society of America, following in his father's footsteps. Working alongside his father's contemporaries, Jack fights the wizard Mordru, the terrorist organization Kobra, and the time-traveler Extant. Jack has to split his time between Opal City and the JSA's hometown of New York, making him a part-time member. He resigns from the team following his father's death and the end of his superhero career.

Jack lives and operates out of Opal City and has a number of allies. First are the O'Dares, a family of Opal City police officers. In addition, Jack regularly receives advice from a fortune teller named Charity, who has a shop in the alleys of the Opal (Charity had appeared before in a 1970s series called Forbidden Tales of Dark Mansion where she appeared as narrator and host to self-contained stories, not unlike the numerous DC comics horror anthology series). Jack also rescues Mikaal Tomas, an alien who briefly operated in New York under the name Starman during the 1970s. Jack's most intriguing ally is the Shade, an immortal Golden Age supervillain who aids Jack because he considers Opal City his home and wants it to remain quiet. Over time, Jack comes to question whether or not the Shade's motives are more noble than he lets on. Jack also finds common ground with Jake "Bobo" Benetti, a retired super-strong bank robber from his father's days.

Among the Stars and Return to Earth
During his heroic career, Jack meets and falls in love with a woman named Sadie. When she reveals that she is the sister of Will Payton, yet another hero to bear the name of Starman, he vows to set off into space to find her missing brother.

Jack first seeks help in his journey from both Captain Marvel and the Justice League of America. Finally, equipped with his father's consciousness duplicated in a Mother Box, and joined by Mikaal Tomas, Jack sets off on an intergalactic journey. However, a chance encounter diverts Jack from his intended route, and he is lost in both time and space. He meets the Legion of Super-Heroes, counsels Jor-El (father of Superman), and then helps Adam Strange fight an invading empire. As a prisoner of the empire, Jack foments revolt to escape, working with members of the Green Lantern Corps, the Omega Men and the New Gods. Jack meets Will Payton, whose body has been merged with the mind of yet another Starman, Prince Gavyn. Together, the many Starmen work together to save Gavyn's empire. Jack leaves Gavyn/Payton to run the empire, and returns to Earth to tell Sadie her brother's fate.

Upon his return, Jack faces almost all of his foes in a massive battle that nearly destroys Opal City. During the battle, Jack's father sacrifices himself to save the city. Following his father's death, Jack undertakes one final adventure, to resolve the mystery of the last recorded Starman, the Starman of 1951. Having the answer to that final riddle, Jack retires and takes his son to live with him and Sadie in San Francisco.

After Jack Knight
Jack has passed his cosmic rod onto Courtney Whitmore, who calls herself "Stargirl" and currently operates with the JSA. Jack had an appearance in Identity Crisis #1, a non-speaking cameo, sitting next to Stargirl at Sue Dibny's funeral.

In addition, it has been recently revealed that Manhunter (Kate Spencer) is the granddaughter of Phantom Lady, who is Ted's first cousin once removed, making Kate Jack's second cousin once removed.

He and the Shade were seen in a non-speaking cameo appearance, attending Green Arrow and Black Canary's wedding in the Green Arrow/Black Canary Wedding Special.

According to Manhunter vol. 3, #23, he is still living in San Francisco.

James Robinson returned to the Starman series in January 2010 for a single issue (#81) that was a tie-in to the DC event, Blackest Night. It was one of the eight "dead" titles being revived for one issue. This issue did not feature Jack Knight, but instead focused on Opal City, the Shade, and a Black Lantern Starman. During the events of the issue, David's corpse is reborn as a Black Lantern; he attacks the Shade and Hope O'Dare, and announces plans to go to San Francisco to kill Jack, but he is ultimately defeated.

In the acclaimed alternate future tale Kingdom Come, Jack has a teenaged African American successor known as "Stars". Though he takes his name and motif from the Star-Spangled Kid, Stars uses Jack's cosmic staff and dresses in a similar leather jacket and bandana. Though Jack's ultimate fate is not explicitly mentioned, Thom Kallor has replaced him as Starman in this reality.

In the alternate future of the Titans Tomorrow, Courtney has changed her name to "Starwoman" and now carries Jack's trademark jacket in addition to the staff. This is based on an earlier concept introduced in Young Justice: Sins of Youth when Courtney and Jack temporarily changed roles after being turned into an adult and child, respectively.

Powers and equipment
Jack Knight has no superpowers. Although he has been told by Charity that he possesses the same sight as she, only to a lesser degree, he has never truly explored it. Instead, he wields a "cosmic staff", a device invented by Jack's father Ted, the original Starman. The cosmic staff utilizes the same technology as the prototype "gravity rods" that Ted once wielded, and which Jack used before his father created the cosmic staff for him. The cosmic staff grants Jack powers including rapid flight, levitation of objects, and energy manipulation. The staff absorbs stellar energy which can then be manipulated into defensive force fields and offensive energy blasts of incredible power. Jack can use both powers at once to protect himself from atmospheric damage in high-velocity flight. Another power of the rod, seen late in the series, is that it is capable of receiving Jack's mental commands from a distance (this is a feature of the device, an ability to "attune itself to the user", and not a power of Jack's). At present, the staff is attuned to its current wielder, Stargirl; it seems difficult to quickly change the staff's affiliation.

Jack is also a competent martial artist, trained primarily in jujutsu.

Reception
The character of Jack Knight, specifically his relationship with his father and Opal City, has been seen as an example of a "new wave" of DC Comics from the 1990s reviving Golden Age heroes, with an emphasis on nostalgia, legacy, and mythology building.

In other media

Television
A television series based on Jack Knight / Starman and his father Ted Knight was being developed by the creators of Smallville and Birds of Prey. Following the latter series' failure in 2003, the Starman series was described as "indefinitely on hold".

Merchandise
 Jack Knight / Starman received two figures in the DC Direct line in 1999.
 Jack Knight / Starman received a figure in Mattel's DC Universe Classics line.

See also
List of Starman characters

References

External links
Starman (1994) at Don Markstein's Toonopedia. Archived from the original on October 23, 2017.

Characters created by James Robinson
Comics characters introduced in 1994
DC Comics martial artists
DC Comics male superheroes
DC Comics telekinetics
DC Comics titles
Eisner Award winners
Fictional characters with energy-manipulation abilities
Fictional characters with gravity abilities
Fictional shopkeepers
Vigilante characters in comics
Starman (DC Comics)